Helmuth Perz (born 6 September 1923) was an Austrian long-distance runner. He competed in the men's 5000 metres at the 1952 Summer Olympics.

References

External links
  

1923 births
Possibly living people
Athletes (track and field) at the 1952 Summer Olympics
Austrian male long-distance runners
Olympic athletes of Austria
Place of birth missing